Tree Colored See is a collaborative studio album by Nobody and Mystic Chords of Memory. It was released on Mush Records in 2006. "Broaden a New Sound" was released as a single from the album.

Critical reception

Jennifer Kelly of PopMatters gave the album 6 stars out of 10, commenting that "while Tree Colored See is not a radical departure from the Mystic Chords' self-titled first album, it is a somewhat more rhythmic and complex affair." Rick Anderson of AllMusic gave the album 3.5 stars out of 5, writing, "Those familiar with their work as separate entities won't be too surprised by the way they sound as a trio: imagine vague but attractive melodies sung in a gauzy, slightly adenoidal 1960s male whine (multi-tracked for maximum retro-psychedelic effect) and underpinned by weird but highly effective loops and rhythm samples." He added, "The album ends with more of a whimper than a bang, but up until then everything is just interesting enough to keep you consistently intrigued."

Track listing

Personnel
Credits adapted from liner notes.

 Nobody – music, mixing, mastering
 Mystic Chords of Memory – music
 Omid Walizadeh – additional percussion (1)
 Derf Reklaw – flute (2, 9)
 Christopher Berens – vibraphone (10)
 Isaiah "Ikey" Owens – additional keyboards (10)
 Farmer Dave Scher – additional keyboards (11), slide guitar (11)
 Dave Cooley – mixing, mastering
 Soap Design Co. – cover art, layout design
 Kutmah – illustration

References

External links
 

2006 albums
Collaborative albums
Mush Records albums
Mystic Chords of Memory albums